Half-widow is a term given to Kashmiri women whose husbands have disappeared and were still missing during the ongoing conflict in Kashmir.  These women are called "half-widows" because they have no idea whether their husbands are dead or alive.

Thousands of husbands in Kashmir disappeared during the conflict.

Most of the half-widows have not remarried due to doubt about their husband's fate and a lack of consensus among Muslim scholars on the issue. In Kashmir, a group of religious scholars issued a fatwa on the 26 of December 2013 saying that half-widows are allowed to remarry after a waiting period of four years.

References

Kashmir conflict
Marriage in Islam
Marriage law
Widowhood